The 2014–15 season is Sunderland's 8th consecutive season in the top division of English football, the Premier League.

Players

Current reserve players with first-team appearances

Out on loan

Transfers

In

Loan in

Out

Loans out

Statistics

Appearances and goals

|-
|colspan="14"|Players out on loan:

|-
|colspan="14"|Players no longer with club:

|-
|}

Goalscorers

Clean sheets

Disciplinary record

Match details

Pre-season and friendlies

Premier League

League table

Results summary

Results by matchday

Matches
The fixtures for the 2014–15 season were announced on 18 June 2014 at 9am.

FA Cup

Football League Cup

First team squad

References

Sunderland A.F.C. seasons
Sunderland